The Mt. Shavano Hatchery is a Colorado Parks and Wildlife cold water fish production facility located near Arkansas River headwaters at the base of Big Baldy Mountain in Chaffee County. This facility is considered one of the largest trout units in the state.

History
Mt. Shavano Hatchery was inaugurated in 1956 but was originally a privately owned facility. The building was originally a frame building with 10 pools using springs that flowed about 200 gallons per minute. After a drop in the water table, the owner discontinued raising fish. It is speculated that the original hatchery was Frantzhurst Rainbow Trout Company located along Fountain Creek. In 1956, the state acquired this facility and renamed it Mount Shavano Hatchery and Rearing Unit.

Fish species
Hatchery staff works to support the raising of 420,000 Whirling Disease negative catchable trout and about 2.6 million subcatchable trout and kokanee salmon annually. Rainbow trout, Snake River cutthroat, cutthroat/rainbow crosses (cutbow), as well as kokanee salmon are raised at the unit. Their source of water comes from a groundwater spring.

References 

Fish hatcheries in the United States
Buildings and structures in Chaffee County, Colorado
Tourist attractions in Colorado